Bongmu Leports Park is a recreational (leisure sports) park at PalGong mountain in Daegu, South Korea.
It is opened 1992 October.
All kinds of sports facilities is equipped such as foot volleyball court, a basketball court, a badminton court, a tennis court, roller skates court, a wrestling court, weight room.

References

Parks in Daegu
Dong District, Daegu
Sports venues in Daegu
1992 establishments in South Korea